Somkiat Chantra (born 15 December 1998) is a Thai motorcycle rider, competing in the Moto2 World Championship for Honda Team Asia.

Career

Early career
Coming through the Shell Advance Asia Talent Cup ranks, Chantra gained fame by becoming the champion in 2016. He competed in the 2017 FIM CEV Moto3 Junior World Championship, and qualified on Pole Position in the season opener, but crashed out of the race. He would finish 8th in Le Mans, 13th in Jerez, 7th in Aragon, and 10th in Valencia, finishing the season 20th overall, with 26 points. He stayed in the 2018 FIM CEV Moto3 Junior World Championship, and was a constant finisher in the high points scoring places, but could not score a podium, his season's best result a 4th place in France. He ended the year 9th in the standings, with 61 total points.

Moto3 World Championship
Chantra was given a wild-card race appearance as his debut in Grand Prix racing, in the 2018 Thailand motorcycle Grand Prix, his home GP. He seized his chance, crossing the line in ninth place, scoring a brilliant seven points, and earning himself a full-time ride for next season.

Moto2 World Championship

Idemitsu Honda Team Asia (2019–present)
Riding for the newly formed Honda Asia Team in 2019, created specifically to give Asian riders a chance in Moto2 and Moto3, Chantra performed well as a rookie, scoring 23 points in the season, while his teammates Dimas Ekky Pratama, Andi Farid Izdihar, Teppei Nagoe, and Gerry Salim scored none.

Racing full time for Honda Asia Team again in 2020, Chantra struggled to reproduce what he did last season, scoring points in just two races, ending the season with 10 points. His teammate was Izdihar for the whole year, who scored no points.

Chantra had a bounce-back 2021 season, and so did the Honda Asia Team. Chantra scored 37 points throughout the year, his highest finish coming in Austria, where rookie teammate Ai Ogura came in second place, and Chantra in fifth, scoring a season-high in points for the team.

Career statistics

Asia Talent Cup

Races by year
(key) (Races in bold indicate pole position; races in italics indicate fastest lap)

Grand Prix motorcycle racing

By season

By class

Races by year
(key) (Races in bold indicate pole position; races in italics indicate fastest lap)

References

External links
 

1998 births
Living people
Somkiat Chantra
Moto2 World Championship riders
Moto3 World Championship riders
Somkiat Chantra